Maulana Shakhawat is a Bangladeshi politician and leader of the Islamist Khelafat Majlish party, holding the title of Nayab-i-Ameer. He was briefly arrested in 2010 by Bangladeshi police and later placed on remand in a case of abduction of physician Dr. Azizur Rahman.

References

Living people
Bangladeshi politicians
Year of birth missing (living people)